Landscape for a Good Woman: A Story of Two Lives is a non-fiction book by Carolyn Steedman, published by Rutgers University Press in 1987. The book is an autobiographical class analysis which looks at the author's working class upbringing in 1950s London.

References

1987 non-fiction books
American non-fiction books
Feminist books
Rutgers University Press books
1950s in London